Oswaldo José Henríquez Bocanegra born in March 10, 1989 in Santa Marta, Magdalena, also known as Oswaldo Henríquez, is a Colombian football defender who is currently playing for Criciúma. He is a product of the Millonarios youth system and played with Millonarios first team till November 2016.

Career

Millionarios

Querétano (loan)
On 3 January 2013 Henríquez signed, on loan, with Liga MX club Querétaro.

Sport Recife
On 11 January 2016 Henríquez signed a three-year contract with Brazilian club Sport Recife on a free transfer.

On 9 July 2018 Henríquez and Sport Recife agreed to terminate his contract due to the salary arrears with the player. As this, he became free to sign with another Brazilian club, Vasco da Gama

Vasco da Gama
On 3 July 2018 Vasco da Gama came to terms with Henríquez to sign him from Sport Recife. Few days later, on 15 July, both club and player signed officially.

Bnei Sakhnin
On 18 August 2020 signed in the Israeli Premier League club Bnei Sakhnin.

Career statistics
(Correct .)

Honours
Millionarios
 Copa Colombia: 2011
 Categoría Primera A: 2012-II

Sport Recife
 Campeonato Pernambucano: 2017

References

External links

1989 births
Living people
Colombian footballers
Millonarios F.C. players
Querétaro F.C. footballers
Sport Club do Recife players
CR Vasco da Gama players
Bnei Sakhnin F.C. players
Deportivo Pasto footballers
Águilas Doradas Rionegro players
Categoría Primera A players
Liga MX players
Campeonato Brasileiro Série A players
Israeli Premier League players
Colombian expatriate footballers
Expatriate footballers in Mexico
Expatriate footballers in Brazil
Expatriate footballers in Israel
Colombian expatriate sportspeople in Mexico
Colombian expatriate sportspeople in Brazil
Colombian expatriate sportspeople in Israel
People from Santa Marta
Association football defenders
Sportspeople from Magdalena Department
21st-century Colombian people